Fikus may refer to:

Fikus, a track from the album The Story of the Ghost by Phish
Marian Fikus (born 1938), Polish architect
, Polish journalist, the namesake of the Polish award in mass media,